Misha Schubert (born 22 February 1973) in an Australian newspaper journalist. She was appointed Chief Executive Officer of Science & Technology Australia in March 2020. She was formerly Director, Strategic Communications at Universities Australia. She has previously worked Director of Communications for the RECOGNISE movement, campaigning for recognition of Aboriginal and Torres Strait Islander people in the Australian Constitution. Prior to this Schubert was national political editor for The Sunday Age, political correspondent for The Age and as a reporter for The Australian.

Schubert has been a vice president of the National Press Club of Australia since 2008, having been elected to the Board in 2006. She is also a life member of the YWCA Victoria.

References

External links
 
 Misha Schubert, in The Australian Women's Register

1973 births
Living people
Australian women journalists
21st-century Australian journalists